Solenosmilia is a genus of small corals in the family Caryophylliidae.

Species
The World Register of Marine Species includes the following species in the genus :

Solenosmilia australis Cairns & Polonio, 2013  
Solenosmilia variabilis Duncan, 1873

References

Caryophylliidae
Scleractinia genera